The 2005–06 A1 Grand Prix of Nations, Great Britain was an A1 Grand Prix race, held on 25 September 2005 at the Brands Hatch circuit in Kent, England. This was the first in the 2005–06 A1 Grand Prix season, and the first race in the history of the A1 Grand Prix series.

Report

Practice
The 2005–06 A1 Grand Prix of Nations, Great Britain at Brands Hatch had a rough start, even before it began. During the first two practice sessions, held on Friday 23 September, there were no less than eight red flags due to on track incidents. In the first session, A1 Team India's Karun Chandhok crashed into Jos Verstappen at a hairpin, sending him airborne damaging his car to such an extent that he was unable to set a time in the second session. Rain marred the second session, causing slower speeds and spins, but nothing as spectacular as in the first. Free practice 3, held on Saturday saw A1 Team France top the timesheets with a 1:15.421 courtesy of Alexandre Premat. Matt Halliday surprised for A1 Team New Zealand, setting the second quickest time, which was good enough to see him nominated for qualifying.

Qualifying
Nelson Piquet Jr. took A1GP's first ever pole position for A1 Team Brazil. Piquet set the fastest time over the entire session, with a 1:14.965 on his third run. Combined with the best first-lap time, he produced an aggregate time of 2:30.769, leading the results by over 0.3 of a second ahead of New Zealand's Matt Halliday. Brazil did not attempt a time in the final run, which was topped by French driver Alexandre Premat, placing them third on the grid for the sprint race. Fourth position went to A1 Team Australia, followed by the home team, A1 Team Great Britain. The A1 Grand Prix rules allow teams to use one driver for qualifying and another for the race, provided the race driver's best practice time is within 102% of the team's best qualifying lap. All teams elected to use the same qualifying driver in the race, apart from A1 Team Malaysia, who used Fairuz Fauzy in the sprint race and return to former Formula One driver Alex Yoong for the main event.

Sprint race

Scheduled for 18 laps or 30 minutes (whichever came first), the first ever A1GP sprint race began with a rolling start, with A1 Team Brazil driver Nelson Piquet Jr. on pole position, followed by A1 Team New Zealand's Matt Halliday. Halliday had some experience in oval races which use sprint starts, and was expected to challenge Piquet into Paddock Hill bend. But it was France's Alexandre Premat who got the best start of the front-runners, slipping inside Halliday to move into second place. Australia's Will Power retained his fourth position, slightly ahead of Robbie Kerr for A1 Team Great Britain. Piquet made it through the first turn with no trouble, and quickly began building a sizeable lead. Meanwhile, ex-F1 driver Jos Verstappen, in the Dutch car suffered damage to his car after a collision with the A1 Team South Africa car driven by Stephen Simpson, forcing him to limp back to the pits and retire from the race. This was a double blow to the Dutch team, as they would then have to start the feature race from the back of the field.  Simpson was also required to pit at the end of the first lap to repair damage from the collision. The field remained in almost the same order for the remainder of the race, as Piquet, Premat and Halliday produced a gap back to Power, who had eventually escaped the close attention of Kerr to secure fourth place. A1 Team USA's Scott Speed benefited from a fantastic opening lap, where he moved from 17th to 11th, holding that position until the end of the race. A1 Team Mexico held onto 6th, ahead of the Pakistani car in 7th, which spent most of the race holding up Portugal, Switzerland and Ireland behind him.

Main race
Piquet took the first position on the grid for the feature race, thanks to his comprehensive victory in the sprint race. A1 Team France's Alexandre Premat suffered a battery problem between the two races which required some frantic work by the pit crew, resulting in Premat leaving the pit lane with 45 seconds to spare. This time the race started with a standing start, but as the drivers set off for a warm-up lap, A1 Team New Zealand's Matt Halliday stalled from third spot, forcing him to enter the pitlane and start from the very back of the pack. This left an empty grid slot in front of A1 Team Great Britain's Robbie Kerr, which would perhaps be an advantage as the drivers struggled for position into the heavily cambered first corner. At the actual race start, A1 Team France's Alexandre Premat also stalled, putting him out of the race immediately, and the drivers behind were able to narrowly avoid him. Brazil again got a good start, leaving Piquet to lead from A1 Team Australia's Will Power on the opening lap. Further back in the field, A1 Team Ireland collided with A1 Team Switzerland, putting both cars out of the race. A1 Team Lebanon driver Khalil Beschir spun off the track, hitting a wall on the outside and then coming back across the track narrowly in front of four cars. Luckily he was able to continue the race, which was not the case for A1 Team India's Karun Chandhok and A1 Team Indonesia's Ananda Mikola, who both did not complete lap 1. A1 Team Portugal soon joined the ever-growing list of retirees, when Álvaro Parente retired with a battery problem on only the second race lap when he was fighting for third place. By the end of lap 2, Brazil led from Australia, followed closely by Great Britain and Pakistan, with Enrico Toccacelo for A1 Team Italy a surprising 5th after taking an early compulsory pitstop, having started in 16th. Further back, A1 Team Germany's Timo Scheider used one of his eight power boosts to breeze past A1 Team Japan's Ryo Fukuda and into 8th place.

Piquet continued to lead and open and impressive gap back to Power, who was being hounded by Kerr for second, but not allowing the British driver any room to get past. Several battles were emerging throughout the field, involving Pakistan and Italy for 4th place, Germany and Malaysia for 6th, and Canada in 9th, struggling to keep South Africa behind. A1 Team USA's Scott Speed rejoined the race after having to pit for a new nose cone earlier in the race, now lying several laps behind the leaders. With Germany taking its compulsory pitstop, Jos Verstappen in the Netherlands car moved into 7th, capping an excellent comeback from last at the start of the race. A few teams had difficulties in their stops, including A1 Team Malaysia, whose faulty wheel caused Alex Yoong to lose a large amount of time during his lap 9 stop. Pakistan, who had been held up by A1 Team Austria while trying to lap them, also lost out to the Netherlands when both teams pitted.

On lap 13, with Toccacelo attempting a move up the inside of Lebanon driver Beschir, the pair's wheels touched, sending Beschir into a frightening barrel-roll across the gravel trap, and causing the introduction of the safety car, to slow the cars around the track whilst the debris was cleared. This gave the top three a good opportunity to pit, but Brazil had big troubles with a wheel, allowing Great Britain to jump into the lead, ahead of Australia, and leaving Piquet in third. Under the safety car, however, the British car suffered another battery failure, and forcing Kerr to retire and hand the lead to Will Power. Power made the most of the restart, opening up a good lead over Brazil, with A1 Team Mexico in third place. Only a few laps later though, A1 Team Russia driver Alexey Vasilyev spun off the track and forced the safety car to come out again. This time when the race restarted, Piquet was much closer to the back of Power, and took the lead on lap 29. With 32 laps completed, Brazil had opened up a good lead, setting the all-important fastest race lap in the process. Australia sat in 2nd position, in front of Salvador Durán for Mexico, who was being pressured by Halliday. Malaysia held an impressive 5th place, followed by South Africa and the Netherlands.

The positions remained constant for the remaining laps of the race, despite a desperate attempt by New Zealand to make it past the apparently slower Mexico car. Piquet displayed his true speed in eventually winning by 11 seconds over Power, followed by Mexico, New Zealand, Malaysia, South Africa, the Netherlands and Japan, with Canada and Germany closing out the top 10. Piquet's win finished an impressive weekend for Brazil, giving the team the maximum 21 points. However, the gaps in the pointscoring system for A1GP are not large, so Australia lies close behind on 16, followed by New Zealand on 15 and Mexico on 13.

Results

Qualification
Qualification took place on Saturday, 24 September 2005

Sprint Race results
The Sprint Race took place on Sunday, 25 September 2005

Main Race results
The Main Race also took place on Sunday, 25 September 2005.

Total Points
Total points awarded:

 Fastest Lap: A1 Team Brazil (1'16.547 / 183.4 km/h, lap 30 of Main Race)

References

A1 Grand Prix of Nations, Great Britain
Great Britain
A1 Grand Prix of Nations, Great Britain
2000s in Kent